Eva Farkas (born 18 June 1986) is a Hungarian short track speed skater. She competed in the women's 1500 metres event at the 2002 Winter Olympics.

References

External links
 

1986 births
Living people
Hungarian female short track speed skaters
Olympic short track speed skaters of Hungary
Short track speed skaters at the 2002 Winter Olympics
People from Jászberény
Sportspeople from Jász-Nagykun-Szolnok County
21st-century Hungarian women